is a passenger railway station in the city of Ōta, Gunma, Japan, operated by the private railway operator Tōbu Railway.

Lines

Station layout
The station consists of a single island platform, connected to the station building by a footbridge.

Platforms

Adjacent stations

History
Niragawa Station opened on 25 October 1932.

From 17 March 2012, station numbering was introduced on all Tōbu lines, with Niragawa Station becoming "TI-17".

Passenger statistics
In fiscal 2019, the station was used by an average of 2338 passengers daily (boarding passengers only).

Surrounding area
Niragawa Post Office

References

External links

  Tobu station information 

Railway stations in Gunma Prefecture
Tobu Isesaki Line
Stations of Tobu Railway
Railway stations in Japan opened in 1932
Ōta, Gunma